Michael Norton Johnson (born March 2, 1951) is former Major League Baseball pitcher. He batted and threw right-handed.

External links

1951 births
Living people
Baseball players from Minnesota
San Diego Padres players
People from Slayton, Minnesota
Alexandria Aces players
Asheville Tourists players
Gulf Coast Reds players
Hawaii Islanders players
Indianapolis Indians players
Sioux Falls Packers players
Trois-Rivières Aigles players
American expatriate baseball players in Canada